Vijaya Rekha known by her stage name Mounika is an Indian film and television actress who appeared in South Indian films and Tamil television serials. She was the third wife of director Balu Mahendra.

Personal life
Mounika was living together with Balu Mahendra. Balu Mahendra has confirmed his relationship with Mounika in many of his interviews and also in his blog. They started living together in 1996 and married in 1998. But went public about their marriage only in 2004.

Film career
Mounika was introduced by Balu Mahendra in the film Un Kannil Neer Vazhindal that was released in 1985.

Partial filmography

Films

Voice Artist

Television

References

External links 
 

Place of birth missing (living people)
Actresses in Tamil cinema
Living people
Actresses in Telugu cinema
Indian television actresses
20th-century Indian actresses
21st-century Indian actresses
1971 births
Actresses in Malayalam cinema
Actresses in Tamil television